The Quincy Police Station is located at 1 Sea Street in Quincy, Massachusetts.  The original three-story yellow brick Classical Revival structure was designed by the local firm of Clark, Batty and Gallagher, and built in 1925 for $75,000.  It is the city's first purpose-built police station.  It has only modest styling, including brick pilasters separating its window bays, and a simple cornice topped by a parapet which has a raised section containing the city seal.  The building has had a modern addition made to it.

The building was listed on the National Register of Historic Places in 1990.

See also
National Register of Historic Places listings in Quincy, Massachusetts

References

Government buildings on the National Register of Historic Places in Massachusetts
Neoclassical architecture in Massachusetts
Government buildings completed in 1925
Buildings and structures in Quincy, Massachusetts
National Register of Historic Places in Quincy, Massachusetts
Police stations in the United States